Villette-sur-Ain (literally Villette on Ain) is a commune in the Ain department in eastern France. It is located on the banks of the Ain river in the Rhône-Alpes region. Villette-sur-Ain is part of the Dombes and is about 45 km from Lyon.

Population

See also
Communes of the Ain department

References

External links

 La Dombes and Villette-sur-Ain

Communes of Ain
Ain communes articles needing translation from French Wikipedia